Zhao Zhengping (1878–1945) was a politician of the Republic of China.

Biography
He was born in Shanghai. As a member of the Tongmenghui, he participated in the Xinhai Revolution. In 1939, Zhao left Hong Kong to meet with Wang Jingwei. With the creation of Wang's government in March 1940, Zhao served as minister. After the downfall of Wang's government in August 1945, he committed suicide in Zhenhai District, Ningbo, Zhejiang after being charged with the crime of hanjian.

References

Bibliography
 鄭仁佳「趙正平小伝」「伝記文学」ホームページ（台湾、要繁体字フォント）
 
 
 

1878 births
1945 suicides
Republic of China politicians from Shanghai
Tongmenghui members
People of the 1911 Revolution
Chinese collaborators with Imperial Japan
Kuomintang collaborators with Imperial Japan
Presidents of Jinan University
Suicides in the Republic of China